Events in the year 2015 in Slovenia.

Incumbents
President: Borut Pahor
Prime Minister: Miro Cerar

Events

13 January – Construction of the Vinarium Tower commenced
26 September-2 October – ISCM World Music Days, 2015
November – Construction of a border barrier was initiated in response to the European migrant crisis
20 December – 2015 Slovenian same-sex marriage referendum

Deaths

8 May – Adriana Maraž, graphic artist (b. 1935).
2 July – Slavko Avsenik, musician and composer (b. 1929)
11 July – Bojan Udovič, cyclist (b. 1957).
28 November – Janez Strnad, physicist (b. 1934)

References

 
Years of the 21st century in Slovenia
Slovenia
Slovenia
2010s in Slovenia